Elections to Bolton Metropolitan Borough Council were held on 5 May 2011, along with the 2011 United Kingdom Alternative Vote referendum. One third of the council was up for election, with each successful candidate to serve a four-year term of office, expiring in 2015.

21 seats were contested, including 2 seats in the Horwich North East ward following Barbara Ronson's resignation. The Labour Party won 15 seats, whilst the Conservatives won 5 and the Liberal Democrats 1.

The Labour Party gained overall control of the Council for the first time since 2003.

After the election, the composition of the council was as follows:
Labour 35
Conservative 20
Liberal Democrats 5

Election result

Council Composition
Prior to the election the composition of the council was:

After the election the composition of the council was:

Ward results

Astley Bridge ward

Bradshaw ward

Breightmet ward

Bromley Cross ward

Crompton ward

Farnworth ward

Great Lever ward

Halliwell ward

Harper Green ward

Heaton and Lostock ward

Horwich and Blackrod ward

Horwich North East ward 
Two seats were up for election in this ward.

Hulton ward

Kearsley ward

Little Lever and Darcy Lever ward

Rumworth ward

Smithills ward

Tonge with the Haulgh ward

Westhoughton North and Chew Moor ward

Westhoughton South ward

References

2011
2011 English local elections
2010s in Greater Manchester